The Balkan Athletics Championships or Balkan Games is a regional athletics competition held between nations from the Balkans and organized by Balkan Athletics. The first games were held in Athens in 1929, and the most recent were being held in Craiova, 
Romania, in 2022.

Organization
The Games of 1929 were unofficial, and organized by the Hellenic Amateur Athletic Association (SEGAS). They became formalized after 1930 and have been held regularly since, with the exception of the 1940–1953 period due to the Second World War and post-war turmoil. In 1946 and 1947, unofficial Games were organized, under the name Balkan and Central European Games, which Czechoslovakia, Poland and Hungary (1947) also participated.

SEGAS were also central to the creation of the Balkan Athletics Indoor Championships in 1994 – a sister indoor event to the main outdoor competition.

Nations

 (from 1929)
 (from 1929)
 (from 1929)
 (from 1931)
 (from 1946)
 (from 1992)
 (from 1992)
 (from 1992)
 (from 1992)
 (from 1992)
 (from 2006)
 (from 2006)
 (from 2013)
 (from 2014)
 (from 2014)
 (from 2015)
 (from 2016)
 (from 2016)
 (from 2016)
 (from 2017) 
 (from 2018)

Former nations
 Kingdom of Yugoslavia (1929-1940)
 Socialist Federal Republic of Yugoslavia (1953-1990)
 Serbia and Montenegro (1992-2005)

Editions

All time medal table
from 1930 to 2019.

Championships records

Men

Women

1940 athlete naming
The 1940 shot put champion was listed as Arat Ararat from Turkey. The birth name of this athlete was Sokratis Ioannidis, a Greek Orthodox born in Istanbul. Due to political friction between Turkey and Greece at that time, the Turks decided it would be more politically correct to change his name to Arat Ararat. This was the name he was known by in the athletic circles.

See also
Balkan Cup
Balkans Cup
Balkan Basketball Championship

References

External links
BALKAN GAMES/CHAMPIONSHIPS
Balkan Athletics

 
Athletics competitions in Europe
Recurring sporting events established in 1929
Association of Balkan Athletics Federations competitions
Festivals established in 1929